The Riverdale Temple is a Reform synagogue in the Riverdale neighborhood of the Bronx, New York City. The congregation was founded in 1947.

In the 2009 New York City bomb plot, a group of American Muslims planned to blow up the temple. On May 30, 2009, New York Governor David Paterson announced he would give the Riverdale Jewish Center and the Riverdale Temple $25,000 each to improve their security. The money will come from the Department of Homeland Security (DHS) and will primarily involve the installation of alarms and surveillance equipment.

In 2009, the rabbi was Judith S. Lewis. In July 2015, Rabbi Lewis retired and was succeeded by Rabbi Thomas Gardner.

External links
 Riverdale Temple website

References

Synagogues in the Bronx
Riverdale, Bronx
21st-century attacks on synagogues and Jewish communal organizations in the United States
Islamic terrorism in New York (state)
Reform synagogues in New York City